Agustín Álvarez may refer to:

 Agustín Romualdo Álvarez Rodríguez (1923–2011), Spanish Roman Catholic bishop
 Agustín Álvarez (footballer, born 2000), Argentine football defender for Juan Aurich
 Agustín Álvarez (footballer, born April 2001), Uruguayan football midfielder for Montevideo City Torque
 Agustín Álvarez (footballer, born May 2001), Uruguayan football forward for Sassuolo